Lorenzo Javier López Balboa (born October 24, 1963) is a Mexican football manager. 

Throughout his career he has served as manager of Troyanos UDEM, Murciélagos (at three times), Atlético Saltillo Soccer and Gavilanes de Matamoros.

References

1963 births
Living people
Mexican football managers
Sportspeople from Tamaulipas